Tyler Creek is a stream in the U.S. state of Oregon. It is a tributary to Emigrant Creek.

Tyler Creek was named in the 1870s after James M. Tyler.

References

Rivers of Oregon
Rivers of Jackson County, Oregon